Hotepibre Qemau Siharnedjheritef (also Sehetepibre I or Sehetepibre II depending on the scholar)  was an Egyptian pharaoh of the 13th Dynasty during the Second Intermediate Period.

Family
Qemau Siharnedjheritef complete nomen means "Qemau's son, Horus he who seizes his power" and from this it is likely that he was the son of his predecessor Ameny Qemau and the grandson of king Amenemhat V. Ryholt further proposes that he was succeeded by a king named Iufni, who may have been his brother or uncle. After the short reign of Iufni, the throne went to another grandson of Amenemhat V named Ameny Antef Amenemhat VI.

Attestations
A statue dedicated to Ptah and bearing the name of Hotepibre was found in Khatana, but its location of origin is unknown. A Temple-block from el-Atawla with his name is now in the Cairo Museum (Temp 25.4.22.3). This pharaoh is also known by a ceremonial mace found inside the so-called "Tomb of the Lord of the Goats" in Ebla, in modern northern Syria; the mace was a gift from Hotepibre to the Eblaite king Immeya who was his contemporary. Hotepibre is sometimes also credited as the founder of a palace recently rediscovered at Tell El-Dab'a (the ancient Avaris).

Speculations
According to egyptologists Kim Ryholt and Darrell Baker, he was the sixth king of the dynasty, reigning for one to five years, possibly three years, from 1791 BC until 1788 BC. Alternatively, Jürgen von Beckerath and Detlef Franke see him as the ninth king of the dynasty.

References

18th-century BC Pharaohs
Pharaohs of the Thirteenth Dynasty of Egypt
Ebla